Shahab Zahedi Tabar  (born 18 August 1995) is an Iranian professional footballer who plays as a forward for Puskás Akadémia on loan from FC Zorya Luhansk.

Career

Youth teams 
Shahab Zahedi joined Persepolis Youth Academy in 2013 from Paykan before joining Moghavemat Tehran F.C. Academy on loan. He played for Persepolis in the AFC Vision Asia U-21 Tehran Premier League.

Persepolis
Following good performances with the U21 side, Zahedi was promoted to the Persepolis first team in October 2014 by Hamid Derakhshan. He made his debut for Persepolis in a Hazfi Cup match against Kargar Boneh Gaz Bushehr as a substitute for Mehdi Taremi. He made his professional debut for the club in 1–0 loss against Saipa on 21 October 2004. He made five appearances in total for Persepolis in the 2014–2015 season. In 2015, while playing for the Persepolis youth team, Zahedi received a two-year suspension after failing a doping test.

Machine Sazi 
On 5 January 2017, Zahedi joined Iranian football club Machine Sazi on loan for the duration of the 2016–2017 Iranian football season. His debut came three days later, coming off the bench in a 3–3 draw at home against Saipa FC on 8 January 2017. His first start came on 18 January 2017 in an away game against Gostaresh FC. In total he made 12 appearances for Machine Sazi who were relegated to the Azadegan league.

ÍBV Vestmannaeyjar 
On 16 July 2017, Zahedi joined Icelandic club ÍBV Vestmannaeyjar on a one-year deal, becoming the first Iranian player to play football in Iceland. He won the 2017 Icelandic Cup on 12 August 2017. On 30 November 2017, Zahedi extended his contract with ÍBV by three years following strong performances. ÍBV also announced the signing of Persepolis academy players Parsa Zarmian and Ehsan Sarbazi. In an interview with Fotboli.net in March 2018, ÍBV coach Kristján Guðmundsson disclosed an agreement made between ÍBV and Persepolis to develop specific youth players, citing Shahab Zahedi as an example. Zahedi made his UEFA debut on 12 July 2018 in the 2018–19 UEFA Europa League.

Suwon Samsung Bluewings 
On January 16, 2019, Zahedi joined South Korean club Suwon Samsung Bluewings on undisclosed terms. Zahedi's doping history was quickly publicized in Korean sports media, leading the Suwon Bluewings and Zahedi to agree to a mutual termination of the contract only one day following the deal's announcement. The fiasco created some controversy in Korea, prompting criticism of the Suwon Bluewings leadership and leaving Shahab Zahedi without a club until August.

Olimpik Donetsk 
Zahedi signed for Ukrainian club FC Olimpik Donetsk on 4 August 2019 as a free agent, following an extended period without any professional football. Zahedi established himself as a key player in his first season in Ukraine, playing 24 games and scoring 6 goals for Olimpik Donetsk across the Ukrainian Premier League and the Ukrainian Cup. Zahedi finished as Olimpik's top scorer in all competitions for the 2019–2020 season. In his second season with Olimpik Donetsk, Zahedi exceeded his first season's total goal tally on 6 December 2020, following a brace against Rukh Lviv, topping the Ukrainian Premier League's goalscorer charts in the process and generating speculation of a transfer to Ukrainian heavyweight Dynamo Kyiv.

Zorya Luhansk 
On 8 February 2021 FC Zorya Luhansk announced the signing of Shahab Zahedi on a four year deal. Ukrainian sports media reported that Zorya had paid a transfer fee of around 360 thousand euros to Olimpik Donetsk and that Zahedi had turned down an offer from Portuguese club Rio Ave. Zorya Luhansk's press service commemorated the announcement by publishing a video highlight reel of Zahedi's performances over his time in Ukraine. He made his debut for Zorya on February 20, 2021, scoring the only goal in a 1–0 win over FC Mariupol. He played alongside his Iranian teammate Allahyar Sayyadmanesh. Zahedi finished the 2020–21 Ukrainian Premier League season with 10 goals between his two clubs. Zahedi began to stake his place in the 2021–22 Ukrainian Premier League, finishing the first half of the season with 6 goals in 922 minutes played over 16 matches. Zahedi had also come off the bench in the second leg of a Europa League Qualifying round against SK Rapid Wien, scoring his first goal in continental competition, but it was not enough to see Zorya into the next round. Zahedi then made his debut in the inaugural season of the UEFA Europa Conference League against AS Roma, coming off the bench in a 3–0 loss. He scored his first Conference League goal in a 2–0 victory over CSKA Sofia. However, Zahedi's season was interrupted by the sudden commencement of the Russo-Ukrainian War in late February, during the league's winter break, leading to an imposition of martial law in Ukraine and the indefinite suspension of the league schedule.

Puskás Akadémia FC 
On 10 March 2022, Zahedi signed with Puskás Akadémia FC until the end of the season. On 23 April 2022, he scored twice against Fehérvár FC at the MOL Aréna Sóstó. On 30 April 2022, he scored again twice against Mezőkövesd in Nemzeti Bajnokság I at the Pancho Aréna in Felcsút. On 2 July 2022 he signed a new contract on loan until 2024.

International career
Zahedi received his first national team call up in January 2022 for World Cup qualifiers.

Career statistics

Honours

Club
ÍBV
Icelandic Cup: 2017

Zorya Luhansk
Ukrainian Cup: Runner-Up 2020–21

Individual
 Best player round 14 Ukrainian Premier League: 2021–22
 Best player round 3 Ukrainian Premier League: 2020–21

References

External links
 Shahab Zahedi at footballtehran.com
 

1995 births
Living people
People from Malayer
Iranian footballers
Iranian expatriate footballers
Iranian expatriate sportspeople in Iceland
Iranian expatriate sportspeople in Ukraine
Persepolis F.C. players
Suwon Samsung Bluewings players
Machine Sazi F.C. players
Íþróttabandalag Vestmannaeyja players
Persian Gulf Pro League players
Úrvalsdeild karla (football) players
Expatriate footballers in Iceland
Association football forwards
Association football wingers
FC Olimpik Donetsk players
FC Zorya Luhansk players
Puskás Akadémia FC players
Expatriate footballers in Ukraine
Ukrainian Premier League players
Nemzeti Bajnokság I players
Expatriate footballers in Hungary
Iranian expatriate sportspeople in Hungary
Iranian sportspeople in doping cases